Unterleinleiter Castle is a, now levelled, medieval lowland castle near the village of Unterleinleiter in the county of Forchheim in the south German state of Bavaria.          

Walter VI of Streitberg is mentioned as the occupant castle referred to in 1380 as Leinlewter Fortress and which was destroyed in 1409 due to a breach of the Landfrieden. 

Of the former fortification, which could have been a motte and bailey castle, nothing has survived. In 1536 the site was still described as Wale, i.e. a motte.

Literature 
 Gustav Voit, Walter Rüfer: Eine Burgenreise durch die Fränkische Schweiz – Auf den Spuren des Zeichners A. F. Thomas Ostertag. 2nd edn., Verlag Palm & Enke, Erlangen, 1991, p. 204.

External links 
 

 

Castles in Bavaria
Unterleinleiter